Xingan railway station is a railway station located in Xingan County, Ji'an, Jiangxi, China. The station opened with the Beijing–Kowloon railway in 1996.

References

Railway stations in Jiangxi
Railway stations in China opened in 1996